The Ság Mountain is a volcanic hill in western Hungary, Celldömölk that was formed about five million years ago.

It was the backdrop of Farthen Dur in the movie Eragon.

Mountains of Hungary